Jan Frederik Pieter Portielje (20 April 1829, Amsterdam - 6 February 1908, Antwerp) was a Dutch-Belgian painter of genre scenes and portraits; mostly of women.

Biography
He was the tenth of eleven children born to Gerrit Portielje, a bookseller, and his wife, Jacoba Zeegers. He made several extended stays in Paris from 1851 to 1853 and worked as a portraitist, with a large clientele in both Brussels and Antwerp, where he eventually settled.

In 1853, he married Eulalie Lemaire (1828-1903), and they had five children; two of whom, Gerard and Edward, also became painters.

His genre pictures featured elegant women in gardens or luxurious interiors. Some were dressed in Orientalist style.

He had a major showing at the Exposition Internationale d'Anvers (1894), and was a regular participant in the Exhibition of Living Masters from 1848 to 1888. Outside of Belgium and the Netherlands, his works may be seen at the Alfred East Art Gallery in Kettering and the Bendigo Art Gallery in Victoria.

Sources
 "Jan Frederik Pieter Portielje" in: Biografisch portaal van Nederland (Online)
 "Jan Frederik Pieter Portielje" in: Pieter A. Scheen: Lexicon Nederlandse Beeldende Kunstenaars 1750–1950 (Online)

Further reading
Ineke Bruynooghe, Het oeuvre van/The Works of Jan - Gerard - Edward Portielje, Roeselare, 2001

External links

More works by Portielje @ ArtNet

1829 births
1908 deaths
Dutch painters
Dutch portrait painters
Dutch genre painters
Belgian painters
Painters from Amsterdam